Tønjum Church is a parish church of the Church of Norway in Lærdal Municipality in Vestland county, Norway. It is located in the village of Tønjum. It is the church for the Tønjum parish which is part of the Sogn prosti (deanery) in the Diocese of Bjørgvin. The red, wooden church was built in a cruciform design in 1832 using plans drawn up by an unknown architect. The church seats about 175 people.

History
The earliest existing historical records of the church date back to the year 1305, but the church was not new that year. The first church was likely a wooden stave church that was built during the early 1200s. The church had a tower on the west end. It is said that the old stave church looked very similar to the Borgund Stave Church.

In 1814, this church served as an election church. Together with more than 300 other parish churches across Norway, it was a polling station for elections to the 1814 Norwegian Constituent Assembly which wrote the Constitution of Norway. This was Norway's first national elections. Each church parish was a constituency that elected people called "electors" who later met together in each county to elect the representatives for the assembly that was to meet in Eidsvoll later that year.

On 12 January 1823, the old church was heavily damaged by the wind during a big winter storm and it had to be torn down. Soon after, there was some controversy about where to build the replacement church. The local population, however, was firmly against this plan. They wanted a new church built at Tønjum and they wanted the old Hauge Church moved further away and rebuilt in the village of Lærdalsøyri. This situation did not resolve until after Daae's death in 1831 when the local people got their wish to rebuild at Tønjum. Not much is known about the architect of the church, but it was supposedly a man named Tøger from Hatlo. Some of the materials from the old church were reused in the new church. The new church was consecrated on 30 September 1832 by Bishop Jacob Neumann.

See also
List of churches in Bjørgvin

References

Lærdal
Churches in Vestland
Wooden churches in Norway
Cruciform churches in Norway
19th-century Church of Norway church buildings
Churches completed in 1832
13th-century establishments in Norway
Norwegian election church